Kand may refer to:
 Kand-e Bala
 Kand-e Pain

See also
 KAND